Jeffrey Howard James (born November 18, 1988) is an American singer and record producer. He became popular in the Philippines by singing Tagalog songs that went viral. He became one of the most followed "Foreigner" that can sing Tagalog songs.

He gained more popularity when he join Eat Bulaga!'s "You're My Foreignoy" and won the Dabarkad's Choice Award in the GrandFinals.

Early life
James was born in Mililani, Hawaii. He is the youngest of the four sons of Charles James, owner of Chuck James Music Studio. James' father is an African-Canadian and his mother is Mexican American. He attended the Mililani High School where he graduated and then received a bachelor of communication and media studies from the Hawaii Pacific University.

Career
In 2009, James formed his band called "Talk to You Music" (TTYM) with whom he released the single "Hawaiian Girls."

He is called "Hawaii's Hitmaker" for making songs that reached the #1 spot on Hawaii and Japan charts.

James released a new album with TTYM called "Just Be Yourself" last July 13, 2013. He also decided to expand his career in the Philippines. In 2014, he captured the hearts of many Filipinos by making his own version of Tagalog songs on YouTube that went viral on social media and were featured in many TV shows.

On December 25, 2014, he released his album "GoGoGo" under GMA records in the Philippines.

In 2015 he joined Eat Bulaga's "You're My Foreignoy". It is a contest for non-Filipinos currently living in the Philippines, who claim to have the heart of a true Filipino. He joined the contest in its last week where he won the daily round and semi-finals. In the semi-finals he won "Dabarkads Choice Awards" and "Best in Talent" awards, as well as the title of "You're My Foreignoy Mindanao". During the "You're My Foreignoy" grand finals, James was again awarded the Dabarkad's Choice Award after having a total of over 56,025 likes on Eat Bulaga!‍ 's Facebook poll.

In 2017, Jeff James collaborated with rapper Tech N9ne on his track "Brand New Hunnids" from the rapper's Strange Reign album. Also, he released "Bayaning Tunay", a song dedicated to Overseas Filipino Workers. "Bayaning Tunay" was released under GMA Music.

Awards
After releasing their first single, TTYM won the biggest battle of bands in Hawaii called the "MaiTai rumble" which started the band's popularity in Hawaii. In 2011, Bryan Sanchez and Jeffrey James, earned an Engineering Na Hoku Hanohano Award for "Hawaiian Girls".

The single was then also released in Japan and reached the top spot in Hawaii and Japan charts.

In 2012, James's song "Good", reached number one on Hawaiian radio.

His song "Love Me" joined "Hawaiian Girls" and was licensed to Japan and reached the number one spot in radio charts.

James won the 2013 Most Promising International Male Singer Performer of The Year by Top Brand Awards and People's Choice Asia Awards Best New International Male Performer 2013 for his entry "Let's Not Pretend" and "Hawaiian Girls".

References

1988 births
Living people
American rhythm and blues singers
Singers from Hawaii
People from Oahu
American expatriates in the Philippines
Spokespersons
Na Hoku Hanohano Award winners
21st-century American singers